Joseph Pokossy Doumbe (21 August 1932 – 28 April 2021) was a Nigerian-born Cameroonian politician and pharmacist.

Biography
Born in Kaduna, Nigeria to Cameroonian parents, Doumbe moved to Douala with his widowed mother at the age of 7. In 1949, he left for France to attend the Collège Jules Ferry in Coulommiers and the Lycée Michelet in Vanves. In 1959, he graduated from the  after interning at a hospital in Limeil-Brévannes.

In 1960, Doumbe returned to Cameroon and received 1 million CFA francs to open a pharmacy. He opened Douala's second pharmacy, after Mayor Rodolphe Tokoto had opened the first. He served as President of the Syndicat des pharmacies du Cameroun, the Conseil de l’ordre des pharmacies, and the  Association pharmaceutique Interafricaine.

Doumbe began his political career in the 1960s. He was elected to the Municipal Council of Douala in 1962, serving until 1977. He was then elected to the National Assembly on 7 June 1970, where he stayed until 1973. On 6 November 1987, he was appointed 1st Deputy Delegate of the Government of Douala. He was also a member of the Cameroon People's Democratic Movement political bureau. Additionally, he was President of the Conseil d'Administration des Aéroports du Cameroun.

The husband of a fellow politician, Doumbe had nine children. He died on 28 April 2021 at the age of 88.

References

1932 births
2021 deaths
Pharmacists
Cameroon People's Democratic Movement politicians
People from Kaduna